Mayachnoye is a rural locality (a selo) in Krasnoyarsky District, Astrakhan Oblast, Russia. The population was 900 as of 2010. There are 46 streets.

Geography 
Mayachnoye is located 2 km north of Krasny Yar (the district's administrative centre) by road. Krasny Yar is the nearest rural locality.

References 

Rural localities in Krasnoyarsky District, Astrakhan Oblast